Saint Piran Pro Cycling Team is a British UCI Continental cycling team based in the region of Cornwall in southwest England. It was founded in 2018 with the intent of developing Cornish cycling talent and getting an invitation to the Tour de France within five years as a UCI ProTeam. After three years as an Elite National team, the team moved up to the UCI Continental level in 2021.

The team's name is taken from the Cornish abbot Saint Piran. The team's jersey draws inspiration from the Cornish flag and the Cornish tartan, and is unusual in featuring no sponsors. Alongside its UCI Continental team, Saint Piran also maintains development teams and a women's team.

Team roster

Major wins 
2019
  Points classification Tour Series, Steven Lampier
2021
 Grand Prix de la Somme, Tom Mazzone
2022
 Grand Prix de la ville de Nogent-sur-Oise, Alexander Richardson

References

External links 
 
 

Cycling teams established in 2018
Cycling teams based in the United Kingdom
UCI Continental Teams (Europe)